Pete Rose Baseball is a baseball video game published by Absolute Entertainment in 1988 for the Atari 2600 and in 1989 for the Atari 7800.

Gameplay
The game features a "behind the pitcher" viewpoint for pitching and batting, a viewpoint which was introduced by the classic computer game Hardball. In addition, the game features different "bird's eye" views of the field depending on where the ball is hit; there are two infield views (one for each half of the infield) and three outfield views (left field, center field, and right field).

Legacy
When the game was re-released by Activision (who bought Absolute's video game properties after Absolute folded in 1995) for inclusion in Activision Anthology, the game was renamed Baseball, due to the license deal with Pete Rose having expired.

References

External links

Pete Rose Baseball for the Atari 2600 at Atari Mania

1988 video games
Absolute Entertainment games
Baseball video games
Atari 2600 games
Atari 7800 games
North America-exclusive video games
Video games developed in the United States
Rose
Rose
Video games based on real people